Sacha Liam Killeya-Jones (born August 10, 1998) is an American-British professional basketball player for the Oklahoma City Blue of the NBA G League. Choosing four destinations in three years during his college basketball years, he was first a Virginia basketball commit, then switched his commitment to Kentucky and played sparingly for two years, then transferred to NC State, then left the Wolfpack before playing a single game and chose instead to play professional basketball in Europe. In high school, he was named a McDonald's All-American. In 2021-22, he led the Israeli Basketball Premier League in scoring.

High school career

Killeya-Jones grew up playing football at the quarterback position. As a freshman at Woodberry Forest School in Woodberry Forest, Virginia, he played football, a year before giving up the sport in exchange for basketball, which better suited his height and build. For his final two years, Killeya-Jones transferred to Virginia Episcopal School in Lynchburg, Virginia. In his senior season, he averaged 23.6 points, 10 rebounds and three blocks per game and led his team to a VISAA Division II state title. He was also selected to play in the 2016 McDonald's All-American Game. Killeya-Jones left high school as a consensus five-star recruit. He originally committed to Virginia before switching to Kentucky.

College career
As a freshman at Kentucky, Killeya-Jones played 14 games, averaging 2.9 points and 2.2 rebounds in 6.9 minutes per game. He did not play for much of the second half of the season, logging minutes in 14 total games. In his sophomore season, he became a more frequent contributor off the bench, averaging 3.3 points and 2.9 rebounds in 13.7 minutes per game through 34 appearances. After the season, Killeya-Jones announced that he was transferring from Kentucky. On May 15, 2018, he committed to continue his career at NC State and sit out his next season due to National Collegiate Athletic Association (NCAA) transfer rules. On February 28, 2019, before becoming eligible to play, Killeya-Jones left NC State to pursue a professional career.

Professional career

2019-22
In April 2019, Killeya-Jones joined Get Better Academy, a private basketball academy based in Prague. He played 12 games for the academy team Sparta Praha of the 1.Liga, the second-tier Czech basketball league, and averaged 18.7 points and 8.3 rebounds per game. On July 11, Killeya-Jones signed with Braunschweig of the Basketball Bundesliga, the top-tier German league, but never played an official game with the team. For the 2019–20 season, he signed with Kalev/Cramo, an Estonian team competing in the Latvian-Estonian Basketball League and VTB United League. He averaged 10.3 points and 4.0 rebounds per game for the club.

On July 13, 2020, Killeya-Jones signed with MKS Dąbrowa Górnicza of the Polish Basketball League. He averaged 19 points, 8.9 rebounds, 2 assists and 2 blocks per game, but left the team in January 2021. 

On August 23, 2021, Killeya-Jones signed with Hapoel Gilboa Galil of the Israeli Basketball Premier League. In 2021-22, he led the league in scoring, averaging 18.4 points per game.

Oklahoma City Blue (2022–present)
On October 2, 2022, Killeya-Jones was signed to the Oklahoma City Thunder as Sterling Brown was waived. In his first preseason game with the Thunder, Killeya-Jones recorded one block against Vlatko Čančar.
After just one preseason game with Oklahoma City, he was waived on October 4.
On November 3, 2022, Killeya-Jones was named to the opening night roster for the Oklahoma City Blue.

National team career
Killeya-Jones, who has a British-born mother, is a dual citizen of the United States and the United Kingdom. He represents Great Britain at the international level. Killeya-Jones attended the team's training camp for FIBA EuroBasket 2017. He earned his first international cap against Ukraine in the Patras Tournament on 7 August 2017, but did not play, he was only 18-years-old. A few days later, Killeya-Jones saw action for the first time and scored 9 points vs Israel in a closed international test match. He played for Great Britain at FIBA EuroBasket 2022 qualifiers.

References

External links
Kentucky Wildcats bio

1998 births
Living people
American expatriate basketball people in the Czech Republic
American expatriate basketball people in Estonia
American expatriate basketball people in Israel
American expatriate basketball people in Poland
American men's basketball players
Basketball players from New Jersey
BC Kalev/Cramo players
British men's basketball players
Hapoel Gilboa Galil Elyon players
Kentucky Wildcats men's basketball players
McDonald's High School All-Americans
People from Highland Park, New Jersey
Power forwards (basketball)
Sportspeople from Middlesex County, New Jersey